In the geometry of hyperbolic 3-space, the order-7-3 triangular honeycomb (or 3,7,3 honeycomb) is a regular space-filling tessellation (or honeycomb) with Schläfli symbol {3,7,3}.

Geometry
It has three order-7 triangular tiling {3,7} around each edge. All vertices are ultra-ideal (existing beyond the ideal boundary) with infinitely many triangular tilings existing around each vertex in a heptagonal tiling vertex figure.

Related polytopes and honeycombs 
It a part of a sequence of self-dual regular honeycombs: {p,7,p}.

It is a part of a sequence of regular honeycombs with order-7 triangular tiling cells: {3,7,p}.

It isa part of a sequence of regular honeycombs with heptagonal tiling vertex figures: {p,7,3}.

Order-7-4 triangular honeycomb

In the geometry of hyperbolic 3-space, the order-7-4 triangular honeycomb (or 3,7,4 honeycomb) is a regular space-filling tessellation (or honeycomb) with Schläfli symbol {3,7,4}.

It has four order-7 triangular tilings, {3,7}, around each edge. All vertices are ultra-ideal (existing beyond the ideal boundary) with infinitely many order-7 triangular tilings existing around each vertex in an order-4 hexagonal tiling vertex arrangement.

It has a second construction as a uniform honeycomb, Schläfli symbol {3,71,1}, Coxeter diagram, with alternating types or colors of order-7 triangular tiling cells. In Coxeter notation the half symmetry is [3,7,4,1+] = [3,71,1].

Order-7-5 triangular honeycomb

In the geometry of hyperbolic 3-space, the order-7-3 triangular honeycomb (or 3,7,5 honeycomb) is a regular space-filling tessellation (or honeycomb) with Schläfli symbol {3,7,5}. It has five order-7 triangular tiling, {3,7}, around each edge. All vertices are ultra-ideal (existing beyond the ideal boundary) with infinitely many order-7 triangular tilings existing around each vertex in an order-5 heptagonal tiling vertex figure.

Order-7-6 triangular honeycomb

In the geometry of hyperbolic 3-space, the order-7-6 triangular honeycomb (or 3,7,6 honeycomb) is a regular space-filling tessellation (or honeycomb) with Schläfli symbol {3,7,6}. It has infinitely many order-7 triangular tiling, {3,7}, around each edge. All vertices are ultra-ideal (existing beyond the ideal boundary) with infinitely many order-7 triangular tilings existing around each vertex in an order-6 heptagonal tiling, {7,6}, vertex figure.

Order-7-infinite triangular honeycomb

In the geometry of hyperbolic 3-space, the order-7-infinite triangular honeycomb (or 3,7,∞ honeycomb) is a regular space-filling tessellation (or honeycomb) with Schläfli symbol {3,7,∞}. It has infinitely many order-7 triangular tiling, {3,7}, around each edge. All vertices are ultra-ideal (existing beyond the ideal boundary) with infinitely many order-7 triangular tilings existing around each vertex in an infinite-order heptagonal tiling, {7,∞}, vertex figure.

It has a second construction as a uniform honeycomb, Schläfli symbol {3,(7,∞,7)}, Coxeter diagram,  = , with alternating types or colors of order-7 triangular tiling cells. In Coxeter notation the half symmetry is [3,7,∞,1+] = [3,((7,∞,7))].

Order-7-3 square honeycomb

In the geometry of hyperbolic 3-space, the order-7-3 square honeycomb (or 4,7,3 honeycomb) a regular space-filling tessellation (or honeycomb). Each infinite cell consists of a heptagonal tiling whose vertices lie on a 2-hypercycle, each of which has a limiting circle on the ideal sphere.

The Schläfli symbol of the order-7-3 square honeycomb is {4,7,3}, with three order-4 heptagonal tilings meeting at each edge. The vertex figure of this honeycomb is a heptagonal tiling, {7,3}.

Order-7-3 pentagonal honeycomb

In the geometry of hyperbolic 3-space, the order-7-3 pentagonal honeycomb (or 5,7,3 honeycomb) a regular space-filling tessellation (or honeycomb). Each infinite cell consists of an order-7 pentagonal tiling whose vertices lie on a 2-hypercycle, each of which has a limiting circle on the ideal sphere.

The Schläfli symbol of the order-6-3 pentagonal honeycomb is {5,7,3}, with three order-7 pentagonal tilings meeting at each edge. The vertex figure of this honeycomb is a heptagonal tiling, {7,3}.

Order-7-3 hexagonal honeycomb

In the geometry of hyperbolic 3-space, the order-7-3 hexagonal honeycomb (or 6,7,3 honeycomb) a regular space-filling tessellation (or honeycomb). Each infinite cell consists of an order-6 hexagonal tiling whose vertices lie on a 2-hypercycle, each of which has a limiting circle on the ideal sphere.

The Schläfli symbol of the order-7-3 hexagonal honeycomb is {6,7,3}, with three order-5 hexagonal tilings meeting at each edge.  The vertex figure of this honeycomb is a heptagonal tiling, {7,3}.

Order-7-3 apeirogonal honeycomb

In the geometry of hyperbolic 3-space, the order-7-3 apeirogonal honeycomb (or ∞,7,3 honeycomb) a regular space-filling tessellation (or honeycomb). Each infinite cell consists of an order-7 apeirogonal tiling whose vertices lie on a 2-hypercycle, each of which has a limiting circle on the ideal sphere.

The Schläfli symbol of the apeirogonal tiling honeycomb is {∞,7,3}, with three order-7 apeirogonal tilings meeting at each edge.  The vertex figure of this honeycomb is a heptagonal tiling, {7,3}.

The "ideal surface" projection below is a plane-at-infinity, in the Poincaré half-space model of H3. It shows an Apollonian gasket pattern of circles inside a largest circle.

Order-7-4 square honeycomb

In the geometry of hyperbolic 3-space, the order-7-4 square honeycomb (or 4,7,4 honeycomb) a regular space-filling tessellation (or honeycomb) with Schläfli symbol {4,7,4}.

All vertices are ultra-ideal (existing beyond the ideal boundary) with four order-5 square tilings existing around each edge and with an order-4 heptagonal tiling vertex figure.

Order-7-5 pentagonal honeycomb

In the geometry of hyperbolic 3-space, the order-7-5 pentagonal honeycomb (or 5,7,5 honeycomb) a regular space-filling tessellation (or honeycomb) with Schläfli symbol {5,7,5}.

All vertices are ultra-ideal (existing beyond the ideal boundary) with five order-7 pentagonal tilings existing around each edge and with an order-5 heptagonal tiling vertex figure.

Order-7-6 hexagonal honeycomb

In the geometry of hyperbolic 3-space, the order-7-6 hexagonal honeycomb (or 6,7,6 honeycomb) is a regular space-filling tessellation (or honeycomb) with Schläfli symbol {6,7,6}. It has six order-7 hexagonal tilings, {6,7}, around each edge. All vertices are ultra-ideal (existing beyond the ideal boundary) with infinitely many hexagonal tilings existing around each vertex in an order-6 heptagonal tiling vertex arrangement.

It has a second construction as a uniform honeycomb, Schläfli symbol {6,(7,3,7)}, Coxeter diagram, with alternating types or colors of cells. In Coxeter notation the half symmetry is [6,7,6,1+] = [6,((7,3,7))].

Order-7-infinite apeirogonal honeycomb 

In the geometry of hyperbolic 3-space, the order-7-infinite apeirogonal honeycomb (or ∞,7,∞ honeycomb) is a regular space-filling tessellation (or honeycomb) with Schläfli symbol {∞,7,∞}. It has infinitely many order-7 apeirogonal tiling {∞,7} around each edge. All vertices are ultra-ideal (existing beyond the ideal boundary) with infinitely many order-7 apeirogonal tilings existing around each vertex in an infinite-order heptagonal tiling vertex figure.

It has a second construction as a uniform honeycomb, Schläfli symbol {∞,(7,∞,7)}, Coxeter diagram, with alternating types or colors of cells.

See also 
 Convex uniform honeycombs in hyperbolic space
 List of regular polytopes

References 

Coxeter, Regular Polytopes, 3rd. ed., Dover Publications, 1973. . (Tables I and II: Regular polytopes and honeycombs, pp. 294–296)
 The Beauty of Geometry: Twelve Essays (1999), Dover Publications,  (Chapter 10, Regular Honeycombs in Hyperbolic Space) Table III
 Jeffrey R. Weeks The Shape of Space, 2nd edition  (Chapters 16–17: Geometries on Three-manifolds I,II)
 George Maxwell, Sphere Packings and Hyperbolic Reflection Groups, JOURNAL OF ALGEBRA 79,78-97 (1982) 
 Hao Chen, Jean-Philippe Labbé, Lorentzian Coxeter groups and Boyd-Maxwell ball packings, (2013)
 Visualizing Hyperbolic Honeycombs arXiv:1511.02851 Roice Nelson, Henry Segerman (2015)

External links
 Hyperbolic Catacombs Carousel:  {3,7,3} honeycomb YouTube, Roice Nelson
John Baez, Visual insights: {7,3,3} Honeycomb (2014/08/01) {7,3,3} Honeycomb Meets Plane at Infinity (2014/08/14) 
 Danny Calegari, Kleinian, a tool for visualizing Kleinian groups, Geometry and the Imagination 4 March 2014. 

Honeycombs (geometry)
Isogonal 3-honeycombs
Isochoric 3-honeycombs
Order-7-n 3-honeycombs
Order-n-3 3-honeycombs
Regular 3-honeycombs